Pantacantha is a monotypic genus of flowering plants belonging to the family Solanaceae. The only species is Pantacantha ameghinoi.

Its native range is Southern Argentina.

References

Solanaceae
Monotypic Solanaceae genera